Petra Kuříková (born 25 November 1991) is a Czech triathlete. She competed in the women's event at the 2020 Summer Olympics.

References

External links
 

1991 births
Living people
Czech female triathletes
Olympic triathletes of the Czech Republic
Triathletes at the 2020 Summer Olympics
Sportspeople from Jablonec nad Nisou